Monica Jauca (born 3 September 1968) is a Romanian biathlete. She competed two events at the 1992 Winter Olympics.

References

External links
 

1968 births
Living people
Biathletes at the 1992 Winter Olympics
Romanian female biathletes
Olympic biathletes of Romania
Place of birth missing (living people)